Xanthoparmelia annexa is a foliose lichen species in the family Parmeliaceae. It was first formally described as a new species in 1964 by Japan lichenologist Syo Kurokawa. After being transferred to genus Paraparmelia in 1986, John Elix transferred it to the genus Xanthoparmelia in 2003 after the two genera were deemed to be synonymous.

See also
List of Xanthoparmelia species

References

annexa
Lichen species
Lichens described in 1964
Taxa named by Syo Kurokawa